{| class="infobox" width=330
|-
| align="center" |  '1867 in New Zealand: 
|- style="background-color:#f3f3f3"
| align="center" | Other years in New Zealand 
|-
| align="center" | 1864 | 1865 | 1866 | 1867 | 1868 | 1869 | 1870
|}
The following lists events that happened during 1867 in New Zealand.

Incumbents

Regal and viceregal
Head of State — Queen Victoria
Governor — Sir George Grey

Government and law
The 4th Parliament continues.

Speaker of the House — Sir David Monro
Premier — Edward Stafford
Minister of Finance — William Fitzherbert
Chief Justice — Hon Sir George Arney

The number of seats in the House of Representatives is increased to 74 with the creation of four Māori seats, and male Māori are given the right to vote. The Legislative Council now has 36 seats.

Main centre leaders
Mayor of Dunedin — William Mason followed by John Hyde Harris

 Events 
 5 February: Opening of New Zealand's third railway line: 27 km connecting Invercargill and Bluff.
 20 May: Alexandra is proclaimed a borough.
3 June: The Evening Herald is founded in Wanganui. Around the turn of the 20th century, it changed its name to The Wanganui Herald, and continued to publish until 1986.
 11 September: The New Zealand Advertiser, first published in 1859, produces a final issue and is absorbed into the New Zealand Times. It is revived for six months in 1868. 

Undated
 Arrowtown is proclaimed a borough.
 Coromandel Gold Rush (1867–68)
 Major Charles Heaphy is awarded the Victoria Cross. He is the first soldier from any colony to be so decorated.
 While Henry Jenner is fundraising in England for his new diocese there are increasing concerns over his appointment among the New Zealand clergy and the citizens of Dunedin.

Sport

Horse racing
A Wellington Cup is held in Wellington. This is no relation to the annual race held from 1874. Racing had only recently been moved from the beaches to Hutt Park in Lower Hutt and Burnham Water in Miramar.

Major race winners
New Zealand Cup winner: Magenta
New Zealand Derby winner: Scandal

Rowing
The Star Boating Club is formed in Wellington.(other sources state 1867)

Shooting
Ballinger Belt: Sergeant Chisholm (Otago)

Births
 30 April: Douglas Lysnar, politician. 
 19 May: Frank Moore, political activist.
 (unknown date) John Charles Thomson, politician.

Deaths
 16 July: Henry Williams''', missionary.

See also
List of years in New Zealand
Timeline of New Zealand history
History of New Zealand
Military history of New Zealand
Timeline of the New Zealand environment
Timeline of New Zealand's links with Antarctica

References
General
 Romanos, J. (2001) New Zealand Sporting Records and Lists.'' Auckland: Hodder Moa Beckett. 
Specific

External links